DH Cephei is a variable binary star system in the northern circumpolar constellation of Cepheus, positioned about two degrees to the east of the star system Delta Cephei. With an apparent visual magnitude of 8.61, it is too faint to be visible without a telescope. At present it is moving closer to the Earth with a radial velocity of −33 km/s.

This is a double-lined spectroscopic binary system consisting of two near-identical, massive, O-type main sequence stars. Evolutionary tracks place the stars close to the zero age main sequence, with an age of less than two million years. This is a detached binary with a close orbit having a period of 2.11 days, and the orbit is assumed to have circularized. Although initially suspected to be an eclipsing binary and given a variable star designation, it doesn't appear to be eclipsing. Instead, the system displays ellipsoidal light variations that are caused by tidal distortions.

This system lies at the center of the young open cluster NGC 7380. It is the primary ionizing source for the surrounding H II region designated S142. The pair are a source of X-ray emission, which may be the result of colliding stellar winds. The location and rare class of these stars make them an important object for astronomical studies.

References

O-type main-sequence stars
Rotating ellipsoidal variables
Spectroscopic binaries
Cepheus (constellation)
BD+57 2607
215835
112470
Objects with variable star designations